Olimpia Koło is a football club based in Koło, Poland. Olimpia was established in 1920 and currently competes at the 5th level of Polish football.

External links
Olimpia Koło supporters (polish version)

Football clubs in Poland
Association football clubs established in 1920
Koło County
Football clubs in Greater Poland Voivodeship
1920 establishments in Poland